Petr Buzek (born April 26, 1977) is a Czech former ice hockey defenceman.  He was drafted in the third round, 63rd overall, by the Dallas Stars in the 1995 NHL Entry Draft.  After five seasons in the NHL, he returned to the Czech Extraliga in 2003 until his retirement in 2005.

Playing career
Prior to his selection at the 1995 NHL Entry Draft, Buzek was involved in a serious car collision in 1995 after falling asleep at the wheel and colliding with a tree. He broke both his legs, nose and wrist, shattered his right kneecap, fractured his left cheekbone and cracked his forehead. After numerous operations, he had a metal plate and ten screws inserted into his left leg, a plate and seven screws inserted into right ankle, two screws in his right knee and two screws in his left wrist. The accident dropped his stock considerably as he was projected as a top 10 pick, before he was drafted in the third round by the Dallas Stars.

Buzek played three seasons with the Michigan K-Wings of the International Hockey League, during which he also appeared in four games with the Stars.  Buzek joined the Atlanta Thrashers in the 1999 NHL Expansion Draft, and was named to the 2000 All-Star Game as the Thrashers' first-ever representative.

Despite his success in their inaugural season, Buzek appeared in only 14 more games with the Thrashers in the next two seasons before being traded to the Calgary Flames, along with a draft pick, in exchange for Jeff Cowan and Kurtis Foster.  Buzek appeared in 76 games in a season and a half with the Flames.

Buzek returned to the Czech Republic for the 2003–04 season, playing for HC Sparta Praha.  The next season, he played for HC Jihlava and then moved to HC Litvínov before moving to the Slovak Extraliga to play for HC Slovan Bratislava.  On October 18, 2005, Buzek announced his retirement from hockey, citing personal reasons for his decision.

Career statistics

Regular season and playoffs

International

Awards and honours

References

External links

1977 births
Atlanta Thrashers players
Calgary Flames players
Chicago Wolves players
Czech ice hockey defencemen
Dallas Stars draft picks
Dallas Stars players
HC Dukla Jihlava players
HC Litvínov players
HC Slovan Bratislava players
HC Sparta Praha players
Kalamazoo Wings (1974–2000) players
Living people
National Hockey League All-Stars
Sportspeople from Jihlava
Czech expatriate ice hockey players in Slovakia
Czech expatriate ice hockey players in Canada
Czech expatriate ice hockey players in the United States